FC Senec was a football club from Senec, Slovakia. It existed in years 1994–2008. After 2007/2008 season it was merged with FK DAC 1904 Dunajská Streda.

Previous names
1990 – STK Senec
1992 – FK Koba Senec
1995 – FK VTJ Koba Senec
2002 – FK Koba Senec
2004 – FC Senec

Honours

Domestic
Slovak League (1993–)
Best finish: 6th – 2006–07
Slovak Cup (1961–)
  Winners (1): 2002
  Runners-Up (1): 2007
Slovak Super Cup (1993–)
  Winners (1): 2002

European competition history

Sponsorship

Notable players
Had international caps for their respective countries. Players whose name is listed in bold represented their countries while playing for Senec.

For full list, see :Category:FC Senec players
	
 Ľubomír Guldan
 Ľuboš Hanzel
 Ľubomír Michalík
 Krisztián Németh
 Ján Novota
 Dušan Perniš
 Attila Pinte
 Július Šimon
 Milan Timko
 Marek Ujlaky

Senec
Association football clubs established in 1990
1990 establishments in Slovakia
Association football clubs disestablished in 2008
2008 disestablishments in Slovakia